London Buses route 16 is a Transport for London contracted bus route in London, England. Running between Cricklewood and Victoria Station, it is operated by Metroline.

History

The 16 is a long-standing, high-profile route following a nearly straight route between Victoria Station and Cricklewood Garage, largely along the Edgware Road. Twenty LGOC B-type buses were to be used on route 16 but only three were used after the war had ended. On 4 June 1927, LS (London Six) type buses with six wheels went into service on route 16. On 6 August 1929, LT 1 entered service on route 16A (Victoria to Cricklewood) with new livery, running from Cricklewood (W) garage. The LT 1 bus had 54 seats and had an AEC Renown chassis. Until 1970, the route ran beyond Cricklewood to Sudbury Town Station, although the section between Neasden and Sudbury Town was withdrawn and replaced by route 245. The Northern terminus was altered slightly in 1973, to terminate at Neasden Shopping Centre. In 1985, the route gained a slight extension to Brent Park Tesco, Monday to Saturday shopping hours, running daily by 1992. The section between Neasden and Cricklewood Garage was withdrawn on 11 October 1997 and replaced by new route 316.

Metroline frequently cascade vehicles from one route to another, usually with good reason, varying from passenger loadings and vehicle layouts to economy in engineering. One route which has had more than its share of cascades is the 16, which seemed for a time to be getting new vehicles every summer, though the allocation does now appear to have settled down. First to come were Volvo Olympians (designated in the VA category), as an upgrade from MCW Metrobuses, in 1998. These VAs later moved to the 260 and were replaced by an equal number of new Dennis Trident 2s. Those were the first of what was destined to be a short run of success with Metroline for Alexander, as opposed to the Plaxton President which had been specified earlier (though by MTL, before takeover by Metroline) and subsequently became standard.

However, in 2000 these were in turn cascaded, and replaced by the last Alexander-bodied buses ordered by Metroline, Alexander ALX400. This batch of TALs was thus unique. The TAs were moved to route 32, but have subsequently returned, partly to cover an increase in service on the 16. In early 2003, the 16 also included a large number of Dennis Dart single deckers, to free up double-deckers for the conversion of routes 139 and 189 to double-deck. However, full double-deck operation was returned by 17 February 2003, when the Mayor's congestion charge began.

In 2007, the Monday-Friday peak service was reduced slightly, with the introduction of a new route 332, which incidentally replaced the 316 between Cricklewood and Neasden, that route having been introduced to replace the same section of route 16 ten years earlier. Another change to vehicle type occurred in mid-2008, when Alexander Dennis Enviro 400 double-deckers were introduced. These buses were bought for the new contract on route 460, but were instead allocated to Cricklewood Garage, in order to compare their performance with the earlier batch bought for route 332 and hybrid versions due for trial.

New Routemasters were introduced on 26 September 2015. The rear platform remains closed at all times except when the bus is at bus stops.

In 2021, the frequency of the service was reduced from 8 buses per hour to 6 during Monday-Saturday peak times, and from 6 buses per hour to 5 at other times.

On 23 November 2022, it was announced that route 16 would run between Paddington and Brent Park, fully replacing route 332, following a consultation that proposed that it would be withdrawn. This change will be implemented by the end of 2023.

Express Route 616
Route 616 began operating on 15 June 1970 as an express service for route 16, running between Cricklewood and Oxford Circus, Monday to Friday, but later reduced to peak hours only, before being replaced by route 16A in 1976.

Route 16A
Route 16A replaced the express route 616 on 31 January 1976, but running between Victoria Station (not Oxford Circus as route 616 had) and Brent Cross via Edgware Road, Cricklewood Broadway and Staples Corner, Monday to Saturdays. The route was changed from one-man operation to Routemaster operation for a period between 1980 and 1987. The route was diverted in 1981 at Marble Arch to serve Oxford Circus once again. In 1991, the evening service ran between Brent Cross and Kilburn Park Station, although by 1994 the route was running between Brent Cross and Oxford Circus during daily (including Sundays) shopping hours. On 10 October 1997, the route was withdrawn, being partly replaced by new route 189, running via Abbey Road and Baker Street.

Current route
Route 16 operates via these primary locations:

Cricklewood Mora Road
Kilburn station 
Brondesbury station 
Kilburn High Road station 
Maida Vale
Edgware Road station 
Marble Arch station 
Hyde Park Corner station 
Victoria station

References

External links

Bus routes in London
Transport in the London Borough of Barnet
Transport in the London Borough of Brent
Transport in the London Borough of Camden
Transport in the City of Westminster